Sandra Smith ( – 2 June 1989) was a South African woman condemned to death by hanging in 1986 for robbery-homicide alongside her boyfriend, Yassiem Harris. She was the last known woman executed in the country. In November 1989, president F W de Klerk ordered a nationwide moratorium, stopping executions until further notice. In S v Makwanyane in 1995, the Constitutional Court of South Africa declared that capital punishment be abolished, being incompatible with the provisional constitution of 1993.

References

1965 births
1989 deaths
20th-century executions by South Africa
People executed by South Africa by hanging
People convicted of murder by South Africa
South African women